Anthony Levatino is an American obstetrician/gynecologist. He formerly served as a professor and Student and Residency program director at Albany Medical Center.

Biography 
Dr. Anthony Levatino, M.D./J.D. graduated with a Doctor of Medicine degree from Albany Medical College in 1976. In 1993, Dr. Anthony Levatino earned his Juris Doctor degree from Albany Law School in Albany, New York. He served seven years on the faculty of the Albany Medical College, where he taught medical students and medical residents obstetrics and gynecology.

Levatino and his wife attempted to conceive a child without success, and they consequently adopted a young girl, Heather. During the adoption process, Levatino's wife became pregnant with a baby boy. After the family adopted Heather, Levatino continued to perform abortions. Two months prior to Heather's sixth birthday, she was struck and killed by a car. After this event, Levatino had difficulty performing abortions. 

He stopped doing second and third trimester abortions, and eventually stopped them completely. In his career, he performed over 1,200 abortions. He is currently a faculty member at Burrell College of Osteopathic Medicine.

References

American gynecologists
Year of birth missing (living people)
Living people
American anti-abortion activists